Nisht Azoy is the second album of the Montreal-based klezmer band, Black Ox Orkestar. The record's name translates into Not Like This. It was released on 180g LP and CD. Compared to their previous album, Ver Tanzt? more percussion and group singing is utilised.

Track listing
 "Bukharian" – 4:45
 "Az Vey Dem Tatn" – 5:29
 "Violin Duet" – 5:22
 "Ikh Ken Tsvey Zayn" – 5:34
 "Ratsekr Grec" – 4:18
 "Tsvey Tabelakh" – 7:13
 "Dobriden" – 6:50
 "Golem" – 7:21

Personnel
 Thierry Amar – contrabass
 Scott Levine – cymbalum, saz, mandolin, guitar, violin, percussion, vocals
 Gabe Levine – clarinet, guitar
 Jessica Moss – violin

Guest musicians
 Brian Lipson – trumpet on "Ratsekr Grec"
 Pierre-Guy Blanchard – drums on "Ratsekr Grec", "Tsvey Tabelakh" and "Dobriden"
 The Two Doves Friendship Band – various instruments on "Tsvey Tabelakh"

Black Ox Orkestar albums
2006 albums
Constellation Records (Canada) albums